Atenulf I may refer to:

 Atenulf I of Capua (died 910), Prince of Benevento and Capua
 Atenulf I of Gaeta (died 1062), Duke of Gaeta